Honey Creek is a stream in Douglas County in the Ozarks of southern Missouri. It is a tributary of Beaver Creek.

The headwaters of the stream are in northwest Douglas County just to the west of Missouri Route K and about one-half mile south of the Douglas - Webster County line. The stream flows south to south-southwest parallel to County Road 14-531. It flows under Missouri Route 14 to its confluence with Beaver Creek five miles northwest of Ava.

The stream was named for the abundant honey bearing bee trees along its banks.

References

Rivers of Douglas County, Missouri
Rivers of Missouri